Darreh Ney-ye Sofla (also Romanized as Darreh Ney-ye Soflá; also known as Darreh Ney and Darreh Ney-ye Pā’īn) is a village in Tashan-e Gharbi Rural District, Tashan District, Behbahan County, Khuzestan Province, Iran. At the 2006 census, its population was 50, in 7 families.

References 

Populated places in Behbahan County